The C&C 35, also called the Redwing 35, is a Canadian sailboat, that was designed by Cuthbertson & Cassian (C&C Designs) and first built in 1969.

Production
The boat was initially built in Canada by Hinterhoeller Yachts as the Redwing 35 and later renamed the C&C 35, when  Hinterhoeller was merged into C&C Yachts. In all 351 were built of all models, but the design is now out of production.

Design
Developed from the Invader 36, the C&C 35 is a small recreational keelboat, built with a solid fibreglass hull and balsa-cored fibreglass deck. It has a masthead sloop rig, an internally-mounted spade-type rudder and a fixed fin keel.

Variants
C&C 35-1 (Mark 1)
This model was produced from 1969 to 1973. It displaces  and carries  of lead ballast. The boat has a PHRF racing average handicap of 129 with a high of 135 and low of 120.
C&C 35-2 (Mark 2)
This model was produced from 1973 to 1975 and was an improved Mark 1. It displaces , carries  of ballast and has a more conventional partially balanced spade rudder. The boat has a PHRF racing average handicap of 126 with a high of 139 and low of 123.
C&C 35-3 (Mark 3)
This model was produced from 1982 to 1987 and was a completely new design by Robert W. Ball of C&C. It displaces  and carries  of ballast. The boat has a PHRF racing average handicap of 132 with a high of 132 and low of 135. The boat is fitted with a Japanese Yanmar 3GM30F diesel engine.

See also
List of sailing boat types

Similar sailboats
C&C 34/36
C&C 36R
Cal 35
Cal 35 Cruise
Express 35
Freedom 35
Goderich 35
Hughes 36
Hughes-Columbia 36
Hunter 35 Legend
Hunter 35.5 Legend
Hunter 356
Island Packet 35
Landfall 35
Mirage 35
Niagara 35
Pilot 35
Southern Cross 35

References

External links

Keelboats
1960s sailboat type designs
Sailing yachts
Sailboat type designs by C&C Design
Sailboat type designs by Robert W. Ball
Sailboat types built by C&C Yachts